Aidi Vallik (born 11 May 1971) is an Estonian children's author, poet, playwright, translator, columnist and screenwriter.

Biography
She graduated from University of Tartu, studying Estonian philology.

She has written over 20 books for children and young adults. Her most known works are young-adult novels about a girl named Ann (published 2001–2007).

References

1971 births
Living people
Estonian children's writers
Estonian women children's writers
Estonian dramatists and playwrights
Estonian women poets
Estonian women novelists
Estonian translators
20th-century Estonian women writers
21st-century Estonian women writers
20th-century Estonian poets
21st-century Estonian poets
20th-century Estonian novelists
21st-century Estonian novelists
Estonian screenwriters
University of Tartu alumni